The Tenants (Ejareh-Nesheenha) is a 1987 Persian comedy film directed by Dariush Mehrjui. It has been widely acclaimed as the best Iranian comedy film of the 1980s.

Plot summary
The film is about an apartment in Tehran and its various tenants.

Cast
Ezzatolah Entezami
Hamideh Kheirabadi
Akbar Abdi
Farimah Farjami
Iraj Rad
Reza Rooygari
Siavosh Tahmoures
Hossein Sarshar

References
The Lodgers on IranAct

External links
 
 

1987 films
1980s Persian-language films
1987 comedy-drama films
Films set in Iran
Iranian comedy-drama films
Films directed by Dariush Mehrjui